The 1999 Iowa Hawkeyes football team represented the University of Iowa as a member of the Big Ten Conference during the 1999 NCAA Division I-A football season.  It was the first season for new head coach Kirk Ferentz, who replaced  Hayden Fry who retired at the end of the 1998 season. The Hawkeyes played their home games at Kinnick Stadium in Iowa City, Iowa.

Schedule

Roster

Game summaries

Nebraska

at Iowa State

Northern Illinois

The win over the Huskies marked Kirk Ferentz's first victory as head coach at Iowa.

at Michigan State

Penn State

at Northwestern

Indiana

at Ohio State

Illinois

at Wisconsin

Minnesota

Awards and honors

Team players in the 2000 NFL Draft

References

Iowa
Iowa Hawkeyes football seasons
Iowa Hawkeyes football